is a former professional basketball head coach for Hamamatsu, Akita and Niigata and a former college basketball head coach for Akita Keizaihoka University in Japan. Nakamura always said to players, "Play basketball with all your heart." He admires Mike Krzyzewski and Bob Knight.  Nakamura also served for the San Antonio Silver Stars as a scout in Asia. He currently teaches amateurs in Akita prefecture.

Head coaching record

|- 
| style="text-align:left;"|Hamamatsu Higashimikawa Phoenix
| style="text-align:left;"|2008-09
| 52||36||16|||| style="text-align:center;"|1st in Eastern|||4||2||2||
| style="text-align:center;"|Lost in Second Round
|- 
|- style="background:#FDE910;"
| style="text-align:left;"|Hamamatsu Higashimikawa Phoenix
| style="text-align:left;"|2009-10
| 52||41||11|||| style="text-align:center;"|1st in Eastern|||4||4||0||
| style="text-align:center;"|Bj Champions
|- 
|- style="background:#FDE910;"
| style="text-align:left;"|Hamamatsu Higashimikawa Phoenix
| style="text-align:left;"|2010-11
| 46||40||6|||| style="text-align:center;"|1st in Eastern|||4||4||0||
| style="text-align:center;"|Bj Champions
|- 
| style="text-align:left;"|Akita Northern Happinets
| style="text-align:left;"|2011-12
| 52||28||24|||| style="text-align:center;"|3rd in Eastern|||6||3||3||
| style="text-align:center;"|Lost in Second Round
|-
| style="text-align:left;"|Akita Northern Happinets
| style="text-align:left;"|2012-13
|52||26||26|||| style="text-align:center;"|5th in Eastern|||5||2||3||
| style="text-align:center;"|Lost in Second Round
|-
| style="text-align:left;"|Akita Northern Happinets
| style="text-align:left;"|2013-14
| 52||40||12|||| style="text-align:center;"|3rd in Eastern|||6||5||1||
| style="text-align:center;"|Eastern Champions
|-
| style="text-align:left;"|Niigata Albirex BB
| style="text-align:left;"|2015-16
| 52||34||18|||| style="text-align:center;"|4th in Eastern|||2||0||2||
| style="text-align:center;"|Lost in First Round
|-
|- class="sortbottom"
! style="text-align:center;" colspan="2" | Akita totals
! 156||94||62|||| ||17||10||7||||
|- class="sortbottom"
! style="text-align:center;" colspan="2" | Bj league totals
! 358||245||113|||| ||31||20||11||||

External links
 Nakamura's instructional video

References

1940 births
Living people
People from Oga, Akita
Akita Isuzu/Isuzu Motors Lynx/Giga Cats players
Akita Northern Happinets coaches
Japanese basketball coaches
Japanese men's basketball players
Japanese women's basketball coaches
Niigata Albirex BB coaches
San-en NeoPhoenix coaches
Sportspeople from Akita Prefecture